Matteo Prandelli (born 18 November 1988, in Brescia) is an Italian footballer who plays as a forward for A.S.D. Boreale.

Prandelli represents Padania and has competed in the CONIFA World Football Cup.

Career

Montichiari
Prandelli started his professional career with A.C. Montichiari. He played for its reserve team since 2004–05 season. From 2005–06 Serie C2 to mid of 2006–07 Serie C2, Prandelli played 7 games for the first team.

Siena
In January 2007 Prandelli was signed by A.C. Siena in temporary deal. He was signed definitely at the end of season. He scored 16 goals for the reserve of Siena in 2007–08 Campionato Nazionale Primavera as team top-scorer.

Val.d. Giovenco
In mid-2008 Prandelli left for Valle del Giovenco of 2008–09 Lega Pro Seconda Divisione. He was the winner of the promotion playoffs.

Colligiana
In the next season he switched to Colligiana.

Como
On 1 February 2010 Prandelli moved up one level to third division club Calcio Como in co-ownership deal.

In June 2010 Siena gave up the remain 50% registration rights to Como after Siena relegated and lack of appearances of Prandelli. In 2010–11 season, Prandelli played for Como in 2010–11 Coppa Italia and scored once.

Messina
In January 2011 Prandelli left for 2010–11 Serie D club A.C.R. Messina. However, he only played once.

Visé
In mid-2011 Prandelli left for Belgian Second Division club Visé. On November 11 Prandelli had an unsuccessful trial at Brussels but 4 days later he had a trial at Belgian Second Division side Charleroi.

Sambenedettese
In August 2015 Prandelli left for 2015–16 Serie D club Sambenedettese Calcio.
On September, 20th Prandelli debuts with his new team in the starting lineup of Sambenedettese - Castelfidardo Calcio, match won by Sambenedettese for 1–0.

Tivoli
Prandelli moved to Eccellenza club S.S.D. Tivoli Calcio 1919 in December 2019.

References

External links
 
 Football.it Profile 
 
 

1988 births
Living people
Italian footballers
Italian expatriate footballers
A.C. Montichiari players
A.C.N. Siena 1904 players
A.S.D. Olimpia Colligiana players
Como 1907 players
A.C.R. Messina players
C.S. Visé players
FK Kukësi players
A.S. Sambenedettese players
Lupa Roma F.C. players
S.S.D. Tivoli Calcio 1919 players
Serie C players
Serie D players
Kategoria Superiore players
Challenger Pro League players
Association football forwards
Expatriate footballers in Belgium
Expatriate footballers in Albania
Italian expatriate sportspeople in Belgium
Italian expatriate sportspeople in Albania